Amadeo Gasparini is a retired Argentine association football midfielder.

In 1988, Gasparini joined the North York Rockets of the Canadian Soccer League.  In early July 1988, the Hamilton Steelers acquired Gasparini from the Rockets.  His eighteen goals that season placed him third in the league and earned him a berth on the All Star team.  Gasparini remained with the Steelers in 1989.  In the spring of 1993, Gasparini returned to Canada where he played several months with the Toronto Blizzard in the American Professional Soccer League.

External links
 Career

References

Living people
1961 births
American Professional Soccer League players
Argentine footballers
Argentine expatriate footballers
Argentine expatriate sportspeople in Canada
Argentine expatriate sportspeople in Spain
Canadian Soccer League (1987–1992) players
Chacarita Juniors footballers
Club Atlético Platense footballers
Club Destroyers players
Expatriate soccer players in Canada
Expatriate footballers in Spain
Hamilton Steelers (1981–1992) players
Málaga CF players
La Liga players
Segunda División players
Rosario Central footballers
Toronto Blizzard (1986–1993) players
North York Rockets players
Place of birth missing (living people)
Association football midfielders